Suran is a Syrian city administratively belonging to the Hama Governorate. In the 2004 census, Suran had a population of 29,100. Its inhabitants are predominantly Syrian Arabs of Sunni Muslims.

References

Bibliography

 

Populated places in Hama Governorate